Julie Flett is a Cree-Métis author and illustrator, known for her work in children's literature centered around the life and cultures of Indigenous Canadians. Flett is best known for her illustrations in books such as Little You, and When We were Alone, as well as for her written work in books such as Birdsong. Many of Flett's books are bilingual, and written in a combination of English, Michif, and Cree, and serve as an introduction to Michif and Cree for English-speaking readers. Flett's works are critically successful and have been awarded the Governor General's Literary Award and the TD Canadian Children's Literature Award.

Flett is also known for her advocacy work in Vancouver's Downtown Eastside neighborhood with indigenous youth and other community members. Flett is also involved in efforts to preserve and share indigenous languages among English-speaking populations.

Personal life 

Flett was born in Toronto, Ontario where she lived with her Swampy-Cree Métis father and Scottish-Irish mother.  She studied for one year at Alberta College of Art and Design, taking coursework in textiles, before transferring to Emily Carr University of Art + Design in Vancouver, British Columbia , taking courses in film and studio arts. She completed a degree in Fine Arts at Concordia University in Montreal and afterwards relocated to Vancouver. Upon returning to Vancouver, Flett became involved with advocacy work for women on Vancouver's Downtown East Side. Working for the Positive Women's Network as an outreach worker and arts educator. Flett was also involved in print making classes where she worked with indigenous youth and community members.

Early encounters with Inuit printmaking and paintings initially drove Flett's interest in the arts. Cree and Inuit cultures, and artists including Meelia Kelly, Pitseolak Ashoona, Annie Pootoogook, and Christi Belcourt are also notable influences on Flett's work, in addition to her mother who worked as a textile artist. Additionally, The Woman in the Dunes by the Japanese writer Kōbō Abe is stated as having a profound effect on Flett.

Works
Flett's writing and illustrations primarily centre Indigenous people, particularly Cree and Métis children, and their family relationships. Flett's picture books and illustration work as seen in Wild Berries/Pakwa Che Menisu, Lii Yuboo Nayaapiwak Swer (L'Alfabet De Michif)/Owls See Clearly at Night (A Michif Alphabet), and We All Count utilize bilingual texts and themes of indigenous culture, and aim to promote voices of indigenous characters within her body of work. Her work also focuses heavily on language, and the importance of representation of indigenous languages and narratives within contemporary literature. Flett's books, such as Wild Berries, have been praised for their cultural relevance and accessibility, and for their utility as resources for Cree and Michif language education.

Early examples of Flett's work in children's books include her digital collages created for The Moccasins written by Earl Einarson. This style of digital collage work would go on to form the basis for Flett's future work, which eventually grew to include watercolor paintings, and handmade textile patterns inspired by the work of her mother, as well as visual motifs linked to Cree mythology and visual culture. Flett has described her process as largely based on the tone of a given piece, where the basis of the image such as a landscape or interior background, is used to establish the themes and color scheme of the illustrations.

Reception
Flett's work quickly garnered critical attention and favor upon the publishing of The Moccasins in 2004, and gained further attention as her career continued in Zoe and the Fawn.  Flett's 2019 book Birdsong was awarded the 2020 TD Canadian Children's Literature Award, and was named a finalist for the Governor General's Literary Award for young people's literature, selected as a best picture book of 2019 by Kirkus Reviews, School Library Journal, Publishers Weekly, and The Horn Book Magazine., as well as an honor title for the 2020 American Indian Youth Literature Award.

References

External links

 Official website

Artists from Toronto
Artists from Vancouver
20th-century Canadian non-fiction writers
Canadian Métis people
Canadian women painters
First Nations women writers
Living people
Métis painters
Writers from Toronto
Writers from Vancouver
Canadian children's writers
Canadian illustrators
Governor General's Award-winning children's illustrators
Métis artists
Métis writers
20th-century Canadian women writers
21st-century Canadian non-fiction writers
21st-century Canadian women writers
20th-century First Nations writers
21st-century First Nations writers
Canadian women non-fiction writers
21st-century Canadian women artists
Year of birth missing (living people)